Vladimir Olegovich Potanin (born 3 January 1961) is a Russian billionaire businessman. He acquired his wealth notably through the controversial loans-for-shares program in Russia in the early to mid-1990s.

As of August 2022, he was the wealthiest man in Russia and the 38th richest person in the world, with an estimated net worth of $24.4 billion, according to the Bloomberg Billionaires Index. His long-term business partner was Mikhail Prokhorov until they decided to split in 2007. Subsequently, they put their mutual assets in a holding company, Folletina Trading, until their asset division was agreed upon.

In January 2018, Potanin appeared on the US Treasury's "Putin list" of 210 individuals closely associated with Russian president Vladimir Putin. In June 2022, the UK has imposed sanction on Potanin for being one of the major oligarchs in "President Vladimir Putin’s inner circle."

Early life and education 
Potanin was born in Moscow, in the former USSR, into a high-ranking Russian communist family. In 1978, he attended the faculty of the International economic relations at Moscow State Institute of International Relations (MGIMO), which groomed students for the Ministry of Foreign Affairs. Upon graduating MGIMO in 1983, he followed in his father's footsteps and went to work for the all-union foreign trade organization (FTO) Soyuzpromexport, which was an arm of the Ministry of Foreign Trade.

Career

Beginnings (1991–1998) 
During perestroika, Potanin quit the State's structures of Foreign trade and in 1991 created the private association Interros using his knowledge gathered at Ministry of Foreign trade and his previous professional network. In 1993, Potanin became president of the newly formed United Export Import Bank (ONEKSIMbank) (akas: Uneximbank; Onexim Bank; Oneksimbank). Oneksimbank is the financial twin of MFK and was also known as the ONEKSIMbank-MFK banking group which was also close to Andrey Vavilov.

Potanin is a close supporter of Anatoly Chubais who introduced Potanin to Russian Prime Minister Viktor Chernomyrdin.

In 1995, Potanin was instrumental in the creation of the "loans for shares" auctions that became a fundamental pillar of Russia's post-Soviet economic reform. The auctions allowed the selling-off of Russian firms' assets at below market prices and are regarded as the founding moment of Russia's oligarchy. According to the New York Times, the auctions plan was regarded in 1999 "almost universally as an act of colossal criminality."

From 14 August 1996 until 17 March 1997, he worked as First Deputy Prime Minister of the Russian Federation.

In 1997, Boris Jordan introduced George Soros to Potanin which led to the Soros Group supported by Potanin, Anatoly Chubais, and Alfred Koch to have the controlling stake in the Russian communications monopoly over the Berezovsky-Gusinsky group. One year later Soros admitted that his large investment in Svyazinvest was a mistake.

Since August 1998, Potanin has held the positions of both president and chairman of the board of directors of the Interros Company.

On November 25, 1998, Potanin recommended Boris Jordan to be Chairman of Sidanko which Jordan held until February 1999 when he stepped down.

Norilsk Nickel 
Potanin and his long-term business partner Mikhail Prokhorov acquired Norilsk Nickel (or Nornickel) in the early 1990s under the "loans for shares" scheme, owning between them 54% of the firm. Potanin owned as of 2018 a 34% stake in the company. They streamlined operations and turned Norilsk Nickel into a modern corporation.

Dispute with Mikhail Prokhorov 
In 2007, Potanin split with Prokhorov, citing Prokhorov's brief detention by French police over soliciting prostitution as the reason and announced the intent to acquire Prokhorov's Norilsk Nickel assets for a reported $1 billion. Prokhorov offered to sell his 25% stake for $15 billion. However, Potanin refused the deal and it never came to pass.

According to a report published by investigative platform Meduza in 2016, Prokhorov turned to Valentin Yumashev, former Russian president Boris Yeltsin's chief of staff, to appeal to president Vladimir Putin. Reportedly, Putin "phoned Potanin in Prokhorov's presence and chewed him out, saying, 'It's dishonest to cheat on partners.'" Prokhorov ultimately decided to sell his 25% Norilsk stake to RUSAL's Oleg Deripaska instead.

In March 2009, he sued Prokhorov for $29 million over a property disagreement in Moscow.

Ownership dispute with Oleg Deripaska 
In 2008, Deripaska reached an agreement with Prokhorov for the acquisition of his Norilsk Nickel stake, against Potanin's wishes. In return, Prokhorov acquired 14% of RUSAL.

This sparked an ownership conflict between Deripaska and Potanin that was halted in 2012, when Roman Abramovich stepped in as a peacemaker by acquiring 6.5% of Norilsk and thereby maintaining the balance of power between Deripaska and Potanin. The truce also barred the parties to sell or acquire new stakes. The deal made Potanin CEO of the company, as he owned roughly 30% of Norilsk, about 2% more than Deripaska.

In February 2018, Potanin offered to buy 4% of Abramovich's stake. A provisional acquisition agreement was reached in March for Potanin to buy a 2% stake in Norilsk from  Abramovich. The purchase was not yet officially approved as of March 2018, pending a court ruling in May that will decide whether the acquisition would breach the 2012 stakeholder agreement. If the purchase is approved, Potanin would own 32.9% of Norilsk against Deripaska's 27.8%. In April, Deripaska called off the deal citing sanctions as the reason.

On 28 June 2018 the court ruled against the sale of Abramovich assets to Potanin. It was unknown at the time whether Deripaska would exercise a contingent right to purchase shares.

Environmental pollution 
Throughout Potanin's tenure as CEO, Norilsk Nickel has been consistently criticized for its environmental record. The company was named as one of the biggest polluters in the Russian Arctic, and the city of Norilsk was named among the most polluted places on Earth. According to a 2013 report, Norilsk Nickel's operations "discharge some 500 tons of copper and nickel oxides per year and release another 2 million tons of sulfur dioxide into the atmosphere annually", accounting for a life expectancy of local residents 10 years below the Russian national average. According to reports from journalists who visited the city, Norilsk is surrounded by "1.2 million acres of dead forest", or that "nature in a radius almost the size of Germany is dead from severe air pollution", depending on the source.

As a result, pressure has been mounting on Potanin from Putin to clean up Norilsk Nickel's operations. In 2010, Putin stated that solving ecological problems in the Norilsk area must be one of the company's leadership's main tasks.

In September 2016, the local Daldykan river ran red after a suspected break of a Norilsk Nickel slurry pipe released industrial waste into the water. Norilsk Nickel was subsequently fined an undisclosed amount by the Russian Federal Service for Supervision of Natural Resources (Rosprirodnadzor).

During a meeting with Putin in January 2017, Potanin promised to solve environmental problems by 2023 through the modernization of capacities. Briefing Putin on Norilsk Nickel's development and performance, Potanin promised to invest $17 billion over a seven-year period on measures to modernize the company's facilities and reduce pollution from its operations.[13] Potanin said that the company planned to reduce its emissions by 75% as part of its long-term development programme through 2023.[14] In the Norilsk area, emissions were reduced by 30–35% in 2017 alone, according to company data. However, another $2 billion environmental clean-up project is supposedly still outstanding.

In May 2020, a major oil spill occurred at a power plant owned by Norilsk Nickel, flooding rivers with up to 21,000 cubic metres of diesel oil, in what has been described as the second-largest oil spill in modern Russian history.

Other investments 
Potanin also owns a stake in Petrovax Pharm, a pharmaceutical company.

Rosa Khutor ski resort 
Potanin was inspired to develop the Rosa Khutor ski resort in the Mzymta valley near Sochi after skiing with Putin in Austria in 2003. He invested more than $2 billion into the resort after Sochi was picked for the 2014 Olympic Winter Games in 2007.

He allegedly urged Putin to approve expansion in the area to create a "Russian Courchevel", despite oppositional pressure from environmental groups who claimed it would further damage the region.

Following Potanin's complaint about a cost overrun of at least $530 million during the construction of hotels and chalets in Sochi and the Rosa Khutor ski resort (as required by the International Olympic Committee), Potanin sought compensation from the Russian government for the extra costs incurred.

It was later shown that construction of the Rosa Khutor resort had resulted in a vast patch of forest being cut down, although Potanin had announced that construction would require "little excavation and zero logging". This was strongly criticized by environmental conservation groups, such as Environmental Watch on North Caucasus.

Between 2005 and 2010, Potanin invested $500,000 in starting a leopard breeding initiative in the Mzymta valley. In 2015, he asked president Putin to allow for permits to double the size of the ski resort, an expansion that will threaten the leopard program he contributed to.

Iran 
Potanin became the first major Russian investor to acquire assets in Iran after the sanctions against the country over its missile program were lifted in 2016. Through his investment fund New Winter Capital Partners (NWCP), he bought shares of the Swedish Pomegranate (firm), which is a shareholder in a number of Iranian internet companies, such as Digikala, the country's largest online retailer. The investment in Digikala was estimated to be $300 million.

Cryptocurrency

Potanin is a member of the Russian Union of Industrialists and Entrepreneurs (RSPP), a lobby group that sent Prime Minister Dmitry Medvedev a proposal for alternative cryptocurrency regulations in October 2018.

Vneshekonombank 
In May 2015, Potanin was named a co-defendant in a case in which state-owned Vnesheconombank (VEB) was looking for damages for losses from the liquidation of Roskhlebprodukt, in which he indirectly owned a stake. In total, VEB sought $68 million in damages from Potanin and others.

Rosbank
In April 2022 owing to the International sanctions during the 2022 Russian invasion of Ukraine, French banker Societe Generale had stranded Rosbank assets and was seeking a quick exit from Russia. Interros bought the distressed assets. The French banker had paid an estimated $4.3 billion to Interros over the period between 2006 and 2014 to amass nearly all the shares in the Russian bank and its subsidiaries. As a result of this transaction the French banker wrote off its balance sheet $3.3 billion. Four months later Potanin announced his intention to transfer 50% of Rosbank's shares to his own charitable foundation. Another 7.5% of the shares were sold to a subsidiary of Rosbank - the investment company Rusfinance.

Tinkoff Bank
In April 2022 Oleg Tinkov sold his shares in Tinkoff Bank to Potanin-controlled Interros. According to Tinkov, he was offered a price of about 3% of the real value of his shares, but was forced to accept the offer as officials of the Putin administration threatened to nationalize the bank after he publicly criticized the 2022 Russian invasion of Ukraine.

Awards 

In March 2003, he took charge of the National Council on Corporate Governance (NSKU), whose main goal is to improve the legislative regulations in Russia and to introduce professional and ethical standards of corporate governance in Russian companies. The goal is to boost the reputation and investment appeal of the Russian businesses.

In April 2003, Potanin was elected chairman of the board of trustees of the State Hermitage, the most renowned Russian art museum.

He was a member of the Civic Chamber of Russia until 2014.

In 2016, Potanin's charitable organization, the Vladimir Potanin Foundation, donated works of art to be displayed at the Centre Pompidou's exhibition of Russian and Soviet art  along with another 40 donors including Vladimir Semenikhin, the Tsukanov Family Foundation and others. For his efforts, Potanin was awarded the French Legion of Honour later that year.

Potanin was a member of the board of trustees of the Solomon R. Guggenheim Foundation in New York. In March 2022, shortly after the 2022 Russian invasion of Ukraine, he stepped down as a trustee following outrage directed at Russian oligarchs closely associated with Putin.

On 6 April 2022, the Trudeau government added Potanin to its sanctions list over the Russian invasion of Ukraine.

On 29 June 2022, the Johnson government added Potanin to its sanctions list over the Russian invasion of Ukraine.

On 15 December 2022, the US Treasury joined others by adding Potanin to its sanction list.

Investigations 
The FBI announced in July 2018 that ByteGrid, a data solutions provider contracted to store Maryland State Board of Elections data, was owned by a private equity firm in which Potanin is an investor. A retroactive investigative report issued by the US Department of Homeland Security's National Cybersecurity and Communications Integration Center found no indication that the MDSBE corporate network had been compromised. The contract has since been transferred to Intelishift as a precaution.

Personal life 
Potanin's first marriage was to Natalia Potanina, with whom he has three children. They married in 1983 and divorced after 31 years of marriage. In 2014, Potanin married for a second time, to Ekaterina, with whom he has two children.

These three luxury motor yachts built by Oceanco were built for him:
 The  Barbara, built in 2016.
 The  Nirvana, built in 2012.
 The  Anastasia, built in 2008.

Potanin is the only Russian to have signed The Giving Pledge, with a promise to donate at least half of his wealth to charity.

On December 24, 2021 he played a friendly chess match with grandmaster Ian Nepomniachtchi. The game ended with victory for the professional in the 38th move, though not with checkmate - Potanin conceded as a result of Nepomniachtchi’s superior position. Chess experts rate Potanin’s ability highly.

Divorce proceedings with Natalia Potanina 
In 2016, Natalia Potanina filed a $15 billion lawsuit claiming profits of Norilsk Nickel as well as Interros International, in what would have been the world's largest divorce settlement. A Moscow district court rejected her claim in July 2017, arguing that the lawsuit's limitation period had expired.

The claim was preceded by a smaller claim of $7 billion in 2015, after Potanin had offered a divorce settlement including a monthly allowance of $250,000 as well as real estate in Moscow, London and New York. The claim was struck down in 2016. Natalia argued that Russian law demands that wealth accumulated during a marriage is split evenly between the divorcees.

See also 
 Semibankirschina
 List of Russian billionaires

References

External links 
 
 Biography
 Forbes.com – The World's Billionaires 2006 – #89 Vladimir Potanin
 Forbes.com – The World's Billionaires 2007 – #38 Vladimir Potanin

 
1961 births
Russian businesspeople in metals
Deputy heads of government of the Russian Federation
Giving Pledgers
21st-century philanthropists
Living people
Members of the Civic Chamber of the Russian Federation
Moscow State Institute of International Relations alumni
Businesspeople from Moscow
Russian billionaires
Russian mass media owners
Russian philanthropists
Russian mining businesspeople
Russian oligarchs